Jacques-Joseph Villeneuve (born November 4, 1953) is a Canadian racing driver. He is the younger brother of the late Gilles Villeneuve, and uncle to Jacques Villeneuve, the  Formula One World Champion. He is sometimes called "Uncle Jacques" ("L'oncle Jacques" in French) to differentiate him from his nephew, and is also known by the nickname "Jacquo". Villeneuve had a varied motorsport career, taking in Formula Atlantic, CART, Can-Am, snowmobile racing and Formula One, and remains a revered figure in Canadian motorsport circles. Villeneuve was the first three-time winner of the World Championship Snowmobile Derby.

Career
Villeneuve started out racing snowmobiles and he has continued to race in snowmobile events throughout his career. He moved into saloon racing in Canada, winning a Honda Civic series and many races from 1976 to 1978. He then stepped up to the open-wheeler Formula Ford category, and then Formula Atlantic, where he took Rookie of the Year in 1979, then consecutive titles in 1980 and 1981. He also won the World Championship Snowmobile Derby in 1980. At the end of 1981, he took a pair of drives for the Arrows Formula One team, but failed to qualify for the Canadian Grand Prix, or the Caesars Palace Grand Prix.

In 1979 he competed in the Cannonball Baker Sea-To-Shining-Sea Memorial Trophy Dash in a Porsche 928 co-piloted by John Lane (Gilles Villeneuve's sponsor and friend).

1982 started out with Villeneuve winning the World Championship Snowmobile Derby. The track was exceptionally hard caused by bitter cold, and his team set up his sled for the conditions. He took home $11,300 for his win, with cash and prizes totaling over $50,000.  The rest of 1982 was difficult, after his brother Gilles Villeneuve died in May. Jacques spent most of the year in Can-Am, though he would take a one-off drive in CART. 1983 saw him take the Can-Am title, as well as another Formula One drive (narrowly failing to qualify a RAM for the 1983 Canadian Grand Prix). During this period, he also kept up his snowmobiling exploits, winning a number of prestigious races, and had a one-off Sportscar drive at the 1983 24 Hours of Le Mans.

1984 saw a return to CART, with Villeneuve ranking 15th overall, having taken pole position at the Phoenix round. The following year he became the first Canadian to win a CART race, taking victory in the wet/dry race at Road America on his way to eighth overall in the standings. He became the only person to win a third World Championship Snowmobile Derby in 1986. After spending the season of CART and his only appearance in the Indianapolis 500, Villeneuve scaled back his motor racing activities, though he has regularly returned for occasional drives to CART, Formula Atlantic (winning some of these guest races) and IMSA.

He also remained highly active and successful in snowmobiling, also branching out to powerboat racing. On January 18, 2008, Villeneuve was seriously injured in an accident during the World Championship Snowmobile race.  He suffered multiple leg and pelvic fractures as a result, in addition to a spinal injury. It was estimated that it would take Villeneuve seven to nine months to recover from his injuries.  On February 16, 2013, having recovered and returned to racing, Villeneuve suffered another serious accident whilst competing in Valcourt, sustaining a leg injury. He left hospital ten days later.

"Uncle" Jacques Villeneuve was inducted into the Canadian Motorsport Hall of Fame in 2001.

Racing record

Complete Formula One results
(key)

American open–wheel racing results
(key)

CART

See also
List of Canadians in Champ Car

References
Hughes, M. 1998. The Other (quicker) Jacques Villeneuve. Motor Sport, October 1998.

External links
Comprehensive Biography at f1rejects.com
Stats F1 Jacques Sr Villeneuve 
F1 Total.com Jacques Villeneuve Sr. 
Chequered Flag Motorsport's Profile of "the other Jacques Villeneuve"
Nigel Roebuck about Jacques Villeneuve (subscription needed)

Racing drivers from Quebec
1953 births
Canadian Formula One drivers
Indianapolis 500 drivers
Champ Car drivers
Atlantic Championship drivers
Living people
International Formula 3000 drivers
24 Hours of Le Mans drivers
Arrows Formula One drivers
RAM Racing Formula One drivers
World Sportscar Championship drivers
Can Am drivers
People from Centre-du-Québec
Snowmobile racers